The Casualty Actuarial Society (CAS) is a professional society of actuaries specializing in property and casualty insurance.

The two levels of CAS membership are Associate (ACAS) and Fellow (FCAS). Requirements for these levels of membership include a comprehensive series of exams. Topics covered in the exams include statistics, mathematics, finance, economics, insurance, enterprise risk management, and actuarial science. Another class of CAS membership, Affiliate, includes qualified actuaries who practice in property-casualty insurance but do not meet the qualifications to become an Associate or Fellow.

History
The society was founded in 1914 and originally named the Casualty Actuarial and Statistical Society. The present name was adopted in 1921. The society's first president was I. M. Rubinow, who played a key role in its formation. There were 97 founding members of the society.

The CAS was at first primarily concerned with problems of workers compensation insurance, which was introduced in the U.S. in the early 20th century. Eventually members of the society worked on all types of property-casualty insurance, including coverages for automobiles, homes and businesses. The society has now grown to over 9,100 members. Although the majority of members live and practice in the United States, there are CAS members in more than 25 countries around the world.

Members of the CAS are employed by insurance companies, reinsurance companies, insurance brokers, educational institutions, ratemaking organizations, state insurance departments, the federal government, independent consulting firms, and non-traditional employers. There are a number of regional affiliates of the CAS, along with several special interest sections. , there are 4,015 Fellows, 1,817 Associates, and 20 Affiliate members of CAS.

Examinations
The CAS requires all candidates to qualify through a series of actuarial exams covering various aspects of actuarial practice. Passing Exam 1-6 as well as Exam S, the Course on Professionalism, the Validation by Educational Experience (VEE), and two online courses qualifies an actuary for the Associateship designation; passing three additional exams is required to become a Fellow. The exam process usually takes a long time to complete, often near a decade, due to the low pass ratios and the difficulty of the syllabus material.

A number of the earlier exams are conducted jointly with the Society of Actuaries (SOA), and a relatively few actuaries have qualified as members of both the CAS and the SOA.

The subject matter covered on each of the VEE and nine other CAS components is as follows:

Validation by Educational Experience exams
There are two exams for economics and corporate finance.

Preliminary exams
The first five components, known as "Preliminary Exams" consist largely of core mathematics related to actuarial science including probability, statistics, interest theory, and risk models. Exams 1, 2, & 3F (known to the SOA as P, FM, and IFM) are common to both the SOA and the CAS.

This joint sponsorship allows students to work on some of the initial requirements before they choose a specific discipline to pursue. The syllabus has a tendency to be adjusted regularly, which makes comparing exams from different 5-year blocks somewhat difficult.

Upper-level exams

Publications and research
The society's members publish a large number of research papers on various aspects of property-casualty actuarial science. The society's oldest and most prestigious research publication was the annual Proceedings of the Casualty Actuarial Society which was published from 1914–2005. In 2006 the Proceedings no longer contained research papers but only administrative material in combination with the Society's Yearbook. Peer-reviewed research is now published in Variance which focuses on both practical and theoretical research in non-life actuarial science and related areas in the science of risk. Variance's current editor-in-chief is Richard W. Gorvett (University of Illinois). Non-peer reviewed research is published in the CAS E-Forum.

Meetings and administrative structure
The society holds two general meetings each year for the presentation of research papers and discussions about actuarial topics. Several other meetings, specializing in topics such as ratemaking, predictive modeling, loss reserving, or reinsurance are offered each year, along with a series of limited attendance seminars. Each of the regional affiliates also holds regular meetings.

Many members of the CAS are also members of the American Academy of Actuaries, the U.S. umbrella group for actuaries of all specialties. A smaller number are members of the Canadian Institute of Actuaries, the national organization of the actuarial profession in Canada.

The governing body of the society is the 15-member board of directors, elected by members who hold the Fellowship designation. The administration of the society is conducted by a President elected by the Fellows and seven board-elected Vice-Presidents responsible for administration, admissions, international activities, marketing and communications, professional education, research and development, and risk integration and enterprise risk management. These elected officials oversee a large number of task forces and committees composed of society members and others. The largest single committee is the Examination Committee, consisting of more than three hundred society members, who are responsible for writing and grading the CAS actuarial exams. A professional support staff works for the society and is located in Arlington, Virginia.

Controversies

Rescinding of CAS Statements of Principles
In December 2020, the CAS Board of Directors voted unanimously to rescind three CAS Statements of Principles. This action by the CAS Board caused a prompt backlash from CAS stakeholders for whom this presented significant problems, including CAS Members, regulatory agencies, and consumer groups.  In response, the CAS Board voted to reinstate the Ratemaking Statement of Principles in May 2021.

See also
 American Academy of Actuaries
 Society of Actuaries
 List of learned societies

References

External links
Casualty Actuarial Society
Be An Actuary website
Actuary.NET News
Actuarial News
Actuarial Outpost

Financial services companies established in 1914
1914 establishments in the United States
Actuarial associations
Professional associations based in the United States
Organizations based in Arlington County, Virginia